Jordanian Communist Toilers Party (in Arabic: Hizb al-Shaghghilah al-Shuyu'iyah al-Urduni, حزب الشغّيلة الشيوعية الأردني) was a communist political party in Jordan. The party was founded in 1997, through a split in the Jordanian Communist Party (JCP). The party used the name Jordanian Communist Party until it registered with the Jordanian authorities with the name Jordanian Communist Toilers Party. The party was considered more orthodox in its ideology than JCP.

See also
 List of political parties in Jordan

References

1997 establishments in Jordan
Communist parties in Jordan
Defunct socialist parties in Jordan
Political parties established in 1997
Political parties with year of disestablishment missing
Secularism in Jordan